"Telling the World" is a song by English recording artist Taio Cruz, released as the seventh overall single and first single from the second re-release of his second studio album, Rokstarr. The song also appears on his third album TY.O, and in the film Rio as the main theme for the film. The lyrics are sung in the perspective of Blu, the protagonist of the film. The song was released in the United Kingdom on March 20, 2011 via digital download, peaking at #138 on the UK Singles Chart. The music video was uploaded to YouTube on March 18, 2011.

Reception
The song was given 3 out of 5 stars when reviewed by Digital Spy. Editor Nick Levene claimed: "We'll be honest - we're more than partial to a proper movie theme tune. From R Kelly's Space Jam ballad 'I Believe I Can Fly', to Aerosmith's 'I Don't Want to Miss a Thing' from Armageddon, to the Titanic belter 'My Heart Will Go On' by Celine, they often provide us with a much-needed fix of gut-stirring emotion. Given his recent worldwide success, it only seems fair that Taio Cruz would have a pop at it - in this case for the forthcoming film Rio; you know, from those cute-but-slightly-annoying Orange Mobile ads at the cinema. The track  ticks all the necessary boxes: emotive lyrics, an uplifting piano 'n' drums riff and catchy, suitably Brazilian 'ooh-way-oohs', and what's more - he's introduced it's accompanying music video below with a shout-out to us lot at DS Towers. Never let it be said that Taio Cruz isn't a gentlemen - dirty pictures of Ke$ha squatting over a loo aside, of course".

Music videos
There are two music videos for this song. One of them is a short video with Cruz in the studio with the characters interacting. There is dialogue from the film, even added dialogue, and an interruption from one of the monkeys. The other, being longer with a complete version of the song, features Cruz walking on a beach or in a city, even on a bridge. In this video, the clips are muted, and some are being shown on buildings. Both music videos have clips from the film.

Track listing
 U.S. Digital download
 "Telling the World" (RIO Pop Mix) - 4:09

 International Digital single
 "Telling the World" (From the Motion Picture "Rio") – 3:33
 "Telling the World" (Radio Version) - 4:09

Charts

Release history

References

2011 singles
2011 songs
Pop ballads
Taio Cruz songs
Songs written for films
Songs written for animated films